Eloi Imaniraguha (born 01 January 1995) is a Rwandan Olympic swimmer. He represented his country at the 2016 Summer Olympics in the Men's 50 metre freestyle event where he ranked at #68 with a time of 26.43 seconds. He did not advance to the semifinals.

He competed in the men's 50 metre freestyle event at the 2020 Summer Olympics.

References 

1995 births
Living people
Rwandan male swimmers
Olympic swimmers of Rwanda
Swimmers at the 2016 Summer Olympics
Swimmers at the 2020 Summer Olympics
Commonwealth Games competitors for Rwanda
Swimmers at the 2022 Commonwealth Games